Gary Cunningham is an American former basketball player, coach, and college athletics administrator.  He served as the head men's basketball coach at the University of California, Los Angeles (UCLA) from 1977 to 1979, guiding the UCLA Bruins to a 50–8 record in two seasons.  UCLA won conference championships and finished with a #2 ranking in the final polls both seasons.  Cunningham has the highest winning percentage of any coach in UCLA men's basketball history (.862).

Cunningham played basketball at UCLA on the varsity team from 1960 to 1962. He played in the first Final Four appearance for the Bruins in the 1962 NCAA tournament. He appeared on the cover of Sports Illustrated on March 19, 1962. Cunningham was selected by the Cincinnati Royals in the seventh round as the 58th pick of the 1962 NBA draft.

Cunningham was an assistant coach at UCLA under John Wooden from 1965 to 1975.  In 1965 he was the coach of the UCLA freshman team that featured high school All-Americans Lew Alcindor and Lucius Allen. The freshmen defeated the UCLA varsity, rated number-one in the nation, by a score of 75 to 60 in the first game ever played at Pauley Pavilion.

Cunningham retired in the summer of 2008 after 13 years as the athletic director at the University of California, Santa Barbara.

Head coaching record

References

1940s births
Year of birth uncertain
Living people
American men's basketball players
Basketball coaches from California
Basketball players from California
Cincinnati Royals draft picks
College men's basketball head coaches in the United States
Fresno State Bulldogs athletic directors
UCLA Bruins men's basketball coaches
UCLA Bruins men's basketball players
UC Santa Barbara Gauchos athletic directors
Wyoming Cowboys and Cowgirls athletic directors